Ptilochaeta is a genus of plants in the family Malpighiaceae.

Species include:

 Ptilochaeta nudipes Grisebach

External links
 Malpighiaceae Malpighiaceae - description, taxonomy, phylogeny, and nomenclature

Malpighiaceae
Malpighiaceae genera
Taxonomy articles created by Polbot